Neltume Lake is one of the "Seven Lakes" in Panguipulli municipality, southern Chile. The lake is of glacial origin and it is enclosed by mountain ranges of the Andes. It is nearby the small town of Neltume that bears the same name.

References

Sernatur (Chile's national tourism service)

Lakes of Chile
Lakes of Los Ríos Region
Glacial lakes of Chile